The 2020 United States presidential election in New York was held on Tuesday, November 3, 2020, as part of the 2020 United States presidential election in which all 50 states plus the District of Columbia participated. New York voters chose electors to represent them in the Electoral College via a popular vote, pitting the Republican Party's nominee, incumbent President Donald Trump, and running mate Vice President Mike Pence against Democratic Party nominee, former Vice President Joe Biden, and his running mate California Senator Kamala Harris. New York has 29 electoral votes in the Electoral College. Trump announced that Florida would be his home state for this election, rather than New York as it had been previously. This was the first presidential election in New York to allow no-excuse absentee voting.

New York continued its streak as a solidly blue state. Biden's victory came from overwhelming strength with Black and Hispanic voters, especially those from New York City, as well as strong support throughout the state, particularly in suburban areas such as Westchester and Nassau counties, from college-educated, suburban, Hispanic, Asian, Multiracial, and other cosmopolitan voters.

New York weighed in for this election as 19% more Democratic than the national average.

Primary elections
The primary elections were originally scheduled for April 28, 2020. On March 28, New York State elections officials moved the primary date to June 23 due to concerns over the COVID-19 pandemic.

Canceled Republican primary

On March 3, 2020, the New York Republican Party became one of several state GOP parties to officially cancel their respective primaries and caucuses. Donald Trump was the only Republican candidate to submit the required number of names of his 162 total delegates, both the 94 primary ones and the alternates. Among Trump's major challengers, Bill Weld only submitted about half of his required delegates, and neither Rocky De La Fuente nor Joe Walsh sent in any names at all. With the cancellation, Trump was automatically able to send his 94 New York pledged delegates to the national convention.

Democratic primary

On April 27, 2020, New York State elections officials had decided to cancel the state's Democratic primary altogether, citing the fact that former Vice President Joe Biden was the only major candidate left in the race after all the others had suspended their campaigns, and canceling it would save the state millions of dollars from printing the extra sheet on the ballot. However, on May 5, a federal judge ruled that the Democratic primary must proceed on June 23 after a suit made by former presidential primary candidate Andrew Yang.

Among the other major candidates were entrepreneur Andrew Yang, Kirsten Gillibrand, one of New York's two current senators, and Bill de Blasio, the mayor of New York City. However, on August 29, 2019, Gillibrand dropped out of the race. Bill de Blasio as well dropped out on September 20, 2019, after failing to qualify for the 4th Democratic debate.

 Results

Conservative
The Conservative Party of New York State cross-endorsed the Republican ticket, nominating Donald Trump for president and Mike Pence for vice president.

Working Families
The Working Families Party cross-endorsed the Democratic ticket, nominating Joe Biden for president and Kamala Harris for vice president. Several prominent Democrats, including Senators Bernie Sanders, Elizabeth Warren and Kirsten Gillibrand, U.S. Representative Alexandria Ocasio-Cortez, and Senate Minority Leader Chuck Schumer encouraged voting for Biden and Harris on the WFP line, in order for the party to keep ballot access.

Green
The Green Party of New York nominated the national Green Party ticket; Howie Hawkins for president and Angela Nicole Walker for vice president.

Libertarian primary

Future of Freedom Foundation Founder Jacob Hornberger was the sole candidate to qualify for the New York primary ballot. Therefore, in accordance with state law, he was declared the winner of the primary by default. As the winner of the primary, Libertarian Party of New York rules permitted Hornberger to choose 27 of the state's 48 unbound delegates to the 2020 Libertarian National Convention. The Libertarian Party of New York was the only Libertarian state affiliate to choose any of its delegates on the basis of its presidential primary or caucus.

Independence
The Independence Party of New York nominated independent candidates Brock Pierce for president and Karla Ballard for vice president.

General election

Predictions

Polling

Graphical summary

Aggregate polls

Polls

with Donald Trump and Michael Bloomberg

with Donald Trump and Pete Buttigieg

with Donald Trump and Bill de Blasio

with Donald Trump and Kirsten Gillibrand

with Donald Trump and Amy Klobuchar

with Donald Trump and Bernie Sanders

with Donald Trump and Elizabeth Warren

Electoral slates
These electors were nominated by each party in order to vote in the Electoral College should their candidate win the state:

Results

By county

Counties that flipped from Republican to Democratic 
 Saratoga (county seat: Ballston Spa)
 Essex (county seat: Elizabethtown)
 Broome (county seat: Binghamton)
 Rensselaer (county seat: Troy)

By congressional district
Biden won 20 of 27 congressional districts, including one held by a Republican.

Analysis

New York continued its streak as a solidly blue state, with Biden winning 60.87% of the vote to Trump's 37.74%, a Democratic victory margin of 23.13%. Due to a decrease in third-party voting, both candidates increased their party's vote share from 2016, though Biden's margin of victory was slightly wider than Hillary Clinton's.

New York's inexperience processing a large number of mail ballots, having only legalized no-excuse absentee voting in 2019, led to weekslong delays in counting them. Over two million ballots and over 20% of the votes were cast by mail. New York failed to meet its November 28 deadline to certify the election, with hundreds of thousands of votes still uncounted. State Senator Michael Gianaris commented, "if we were a swing state in this presidential election, this would be a national scandal". New York's voting tabulation was updated on March 15, 2021.

The delay in the counting of mail-in ballots wrongly made it seem at first that Biden had underperformed Hillary Clinton in 2016, a phenomenon referred to as a "red mirage." However, when all the votes were counted, Biden outperformed Clinton's margin over Trump by about 0.6 percentage points. This was due to a major improvement across Upstate New York and on Long Island. Meanwhile, four of New York City's five boroughs shifted towards Trump (with the exception of Staten Island).

Donald Trump is the first Republican to receive 3 million or more raw votes in New York since George H. W. Bush in 1988. 

Biden flipped 4 counties that Trump won in 2016: Broome, Essex, Rensselaer, and Saratoga counties.
Biden also came very close to flipping an additional six counties, as he lost Cortland County by 419 votes, Franklin County by 415 votes, Ontario County by 33 votes, Orange County by 113 votes, Suffolk County by 232 votes, and Warren County by just 57 votes. Trump's narrow victories in these counties meant that they were decided by a combined total of just 1,269 votes out of more than 1 million votes cast across all six counties. 
According to exit polls by CNN, Biden won 96% of Democrats, who were 41% of the electorate, 59% of Independents, who made up 32% of voters, and 21% of Republicans, who made up 27% of the vote.

Biden dominated core Democratic constituencies in New York City, winning 76% of the city's vote. Statewide, Biden won 94% of Black voters and 76% of Latino voters. Biden won the upstate of New York (excluding New York City's results), albeit by a much smaller 52.4% to 45.9% margin, or 2,923,127 votes to Trump's 2,561,315. In urban Dominican neighborhoods, Trump reached a measly 15% of the vote to Biden's 85%. Biden also won by 18 points in the Hudson Valley and urban Upstate counties. Trump's core support base came from rural Upstate counties. However, Trump made strong inroads with Orthodox Jewish neighborhoods of New York City and in Hasidic Jewish communities in Rockland County. The shift is attributed to Trump's strong pro-Israel stance as president. New York was one of five states in the nation in which Biden's victory margin was larger than 1 million raw votes, the others being California, Maryland, Massachusetts and Illinois.

See also
 United States presidential elections in New York
 Presidency of Joe Biden
 2020 New York state elections
 2020 United States presidential election
 2020 Democratic Party presidential primaries
 2020 Libertarian Party presidential primaries
 2020 Republican Party presidential primaries
 2020 United States elections

Notes

References

Further reading

External links
 
 
  (state affiliate of the U.S. League of Women Voters)
 

 

New York
2020
Presidential